Davor Marcelić (born 20 May 1969) is a Croatian retired professional basketball player who last played for KK Krka.

External links 
ABA League Profile

1969 births
Living people
Croatian men's basketball players
KK Cibona players
KK Krka players
KK Włocławek players
KK Zadar players
Small forwards
Basketball players from Zadar
Basketball players at the 1996 Summer Olympics
Olympic basketball players of Croatia
ABA League players
Southern Utah Thunderbirds men's basketball players